Kim Falkenberg (born 10 April 1988) is a German former professional footballer who played as a defender.

Career
Born in Engelskirchen, Falkenberg began his career with SSV 08 Bergneustadt and was scouted in summer 2000 by Bayer 04 Leverkusen. At the "Werksclub" he played seven years for the youth teams. In 2007, Falkenberg was promoted to the reserve squad of Bayer 04 Leverkusen and was, after a successful season, loaned to Rot-Weiß Oberhausen on 6 June 2008.

He made his debut on the professional league level in the 2. Bundesliga for Rot-Weiß Oberhausen on 17 August 2008 when he started in a game against TuS Koblenz. He signed on 6 April 2009 a two-year contract with SpVgg Greuther Fürth.

At the end of the 2017–18 Falkenberg retired from professional football.

References

External links
 
 

1988 births
Living people
Association football defenders
German footballers
Bayer 04 Leverkusen II players
Rot-Weiß Oberhausen players
SpVgg Greuther Fürth players
Alemannia Aachen players
SV Sandhausen players
1. FC Saarbrücken players
VfL Osnabrück players
2. Bundesliga players
3. Liga players
Germany under-21 international footballers
Germany youth international footballers